Paraguaçu is a municipality in the state of Minas Gerais, Brazil.

Paraguaçu or Paraguassu may also refer to:

Geography
 Paraguaçu Paulista, municipality in the state of São Paulo, Brazil
 Paraguaçu River, in Bahia state, Brazil
 Cabaceiras do Paraguaçu, municipality in the state of Bahia, Brazil
 Cachoeira, also Cachoeira do Paraguaçu, municipality in the state of Bahia, Brazil

People
 Catarina Paraguaçu (died 1586), Brazilian Tupinambá Indian, Christian visionary, wife of Caramuru
 Ezequiel Paraguassu (born 1963), Brazilian judoka, competitor at the 1988 and 1992 Summer Olympics